Alexander Komnenos Asen was the son of Despot John Komnenos Asen and nephew of Emperor Ivan Alexander of Bulgaria and Empress Helena of Serbia.

Alexander Komnenos was Sebastos of Valona and Lord of Kanine and Valona which he succeeded from his father John (alternatively Ivan) Komnenos. He did not succeed the nearby city of Belgrad which was taken from his father by Simeon Uroš. Alexander's rule was characterized by extensive trade with both the Republic of Venice and the Republic of Ragusa.

It is speculated that he died on 26 September 1371 at the Battle of Maritsa due to the fact that in 1372 his lands were in possession of his father-in-law Balša II.

References 

People of the Serbian Empire
14th-century deaths
Medieval Albania
1371 deaths